The Association of European Research Libraries (Ligue des Bibliothèques Européennes de Recherche or LIBER) is a professional association of national and university research libraries in Europe. As of 2018 its membership includes some 400 organizations. It operates as a Dutch foundation, with headquarters in the Koninklijke Bibliotheek in The Hague.

Overview
The origin of LIBER sprang from a 1968 meeting of the International Federation of Library Associations. Among its founders was Swiss librarian .

LIBER held its first conference in Strasbourg in 1971, and continues meeting annually. Its 2018 conference will take place in Lille. The group also publishes an open access journal about librarianship, LIBER Quarterly.

Presidents
 , circa 1999-2002
 Erland Kolding Nielsen, circa 2005

References

Further reading
issued by the association
  
  
  

about the association
 
  (2006 version )

External links
 Official site
  (Former site)
 

Library associations
Foundations based in the Netherlands
2009 establishments in the Netherlands
1971 establishments in Europe